Located in Wilson, New York, Wilson High School is part of the Wilson Central School District. It holds students in grades 9-12. Wilson High School accounts for 864 of Wilson Central School District's 1,515 students. It is connected to the Wilson Middle School, where grades 6-8 go.

References

External links
 

Public high schools in New York (state)
Schools in Niagara County, New York